Center City includes the central business district and central neighborhoods of Philadelphia. It comprises the area that made up the City of Philadelphia prior to the Act of Consolidation, 1854, which extended the city borders to be coterminous with Philadelphia County. 

Greater Center City is defined as being located between Girard Avenue and Tasker Street. The area has grown to the second-most densely populated downtown area in the United States after Midtown Manhattan in New York City with an estimated 202,100 residents in 2020 and a population density of 26,284 per square mile.

Geography

Boundaries

Center City is bounded by South Street to the south, the Delaware River to the east, the Schuylkill River to the west, and Vine Street to the north. The district occupies the old boundaries of the City of Philadelphia before the city was made coterminous with Philadelphia County in 1854. The Center City District, which has special powers of taxation, has a complicated, irregularly shaped boundary that includes much but not all of this area, and also extends beyond it. The Philadelphia Police Department patrols four districts located within Center City – the 6th, 9th, 3rd and 17th districts.

Neighborhood features

Among Center City's neighborhoods and districts are Penn's Landing, Old City, Society Hill, South Street, Washington Square West, Market East, Chinatown, Logan Square, the Museum District (located along the Benjamin Franklin Parkway), Rittenhouse Square, Fitler Square, the Avenue of the Arts (South Broad Street), and Jewelers' Row.

Center City is home to most of Philadelphia's tallest buildings, including Philadelphia's City Hall, the second-tallest masonry building in the world and until 1987 the tallest in Philadelphia, as well as the tallest building in the world for seven years. In March 1987, One Liberty Place broke the gentlemen's agreement not to exceed the height of the statue of William Penn atop City Hall. Upon the completion of One Liberty Place, no Philadelphia major-league sports team won a world championship for the next two decades, a phenomenon known as the "Curse of Billy Penn."  In an effort to reverse the curse, a three-foot statue of Penn was affixed to the top of the Comcast Center upon its completion as the city's new tallest building in 2007. On October 29, 2008, the Philadelphia Phillies won the 2008 World Series, ending the "curse".

Seven other skyscrapers now exceed the height of Penn's statue, including One Liberty Place's little sister, Two Liberty Place. The Comcast Center, which was completed in 2007, became the tallest building in Pennsylvania, 30 feet taller than One Liberty Place. In 2018, the Comcast Technology Center opened, which is now the tallest building in Philadelphia and the tallest building in the United States outside of Manhattan and Chicago. 1441 Chestnut, which is currently under construction, is also slated to be taller than City Hall. The first publicly accessible vantage point higher than City Hall opened at One Liberty Observation Deck on the 57th floor of One Liberty Place in 2015.

Other Center City skyscrapers include the BNY Mellon Center and the Three Logan Square, which houses a traffic camera used by the Philadelphia branch of the Westwood One MetroNetworks traffic service.

Across the street from City Hall is the Masonic Temple, the headquarters of the Grand Lodge of Pennsylvania, a legacy of the Founding Fathers and signers of the Declaration of Independence, many of whom were Freemasons; these include George Washington and Benjamin Franklin. While Philadelphia's population declined between 1990 and 2000, Center City's population increased by 10% over that same period.

In 2007, the city designated the area bound by 11th Street, Broad Street, Chestnut Street and Pine Street as the Gayborhood.

Neighborhoods 
 Callowhill
 Chinatown
 Fitler Square
 French Quarter
 Logan Square
 Market East
 Old City
 Penn Center
 Penn's Landing
 Rittenhouse Square
 Society Hill
 Washington Square West

Economy

Sunoco has its headquarters in the BNY Mellon Center. Cigna has its corporate headquarters in 2 Liberty Place. Aramark is headquartered in Center City. Comcast is headquartered in the Comcast Center. The law firm Cozen O'Connor has its headquarters in Center City. Kogan Page has its United States offices in Center City.

Lincoln National Corporation moved its headquarters from Indiana to Philadelphia in 1999. In Philadelphia Lincoln was headquartered in the West Tower of Centre Square in Center City. In 2007 the company moved 400 employees, including its top executives, to Radnor Township from Philadelphia.

Government and infrastructure

Buildings
Center City is home to some of the largest and most prominent buildings in the United States, including:
1818 Market Street
Centre Square
Comcast Center, the 23rd tallest skyscraper in the nation
Liberty Place
Philadelphia City Hall, the world's largest free-standing masonry building 
Three Logan Square

Infrastructure

The Philadelphia Fire Department operates five fire stations in  Center City:

Engine 1, Ladder 5, Medic 35, Battalion 1 - 711 S. Broad St.
Snorkel 2, Medic 44B, Battalion 4, Field Comm. Unit 1 - 101 N. 4th St.
Engine 11, Medic 21 - 601 South St.
Pipeline 20, Ladder 23, Medic 1 - 133 N. 10th St.
Squirt 43, Ladder 9, Medic 7 - 2108 Market St.

The Federal Bureau of Prisons Northeast Region Office is in the U.S. Custom House, a part of the Independence National Historical Park, in Old City, Center City.

The William J. Green Jr. Federal Building houses the Federal Bureau of Investigation Philadelphia Field Office.

Diplomatic offices and consulates
The Consulate-General of Italy in Philadelphia is located in the 1026 Public Ledger Building at 150 South Independence Mall West. The Consulate-General of Panama in Philadelphia is located in Suite 1 at 124 Chestnut Street. The Consulate of Mexico in Philadelphia is located in Suite 310 of the Bourse Building off of Independence Mall.

The Consulate-General of the Dominican Republic in Philadelphia was located in Suite 216 in the Lafayette Building at 437 Chestnut Street. It closed on November 7, 2005. The Consulate-General of Israel in Philadelphia was located on the 18th Floor at 1880 John F. Kennedy Boulevard. Israel closed the Philadelphia consulate in 2016.

Education

Public schools

Residents of Center City are included within the School District of Philadelphia. From the 1940s to the opening of what is now known as the Greenfield School in 1954, many residents attended public schools in other areas and private schools due to the low number of public schools in Center City.

In 2005, to prevent the flight of middle-class families, the school district and the Center City District, an economic development agency, started a program that promoted public schools in Center City (including Rittenhouse Square and Society Hill) and adjacent areas in Fairmount, Northern Liberties, and South Philadelphia.

K-8 schools that have attendance boundaries in Center City and areas around Center City include:
 Albert M. Greenfield 
 It opened in September 1954 as the Center City School after the Center City Residents Association (CCRA) advocated for its establishment. It was initially housed in a YWCA and later in the former Jerrold Electronics Building. In 1964 the school district bought the site for a permanent campus, which began construction in 1966 and opened in September 1970.

 Andrew Jackson School
 Bache-Martin
 Chester A. Arthur
 Edwin M. Stanton
 General Philip Kearny
 George A. McCall School 
 George W. Nebinger School
 James R. Ludlow
 Laura Wheeler Waring
 Spring Garden School
 William H. Harrison
 William M. Meredith School

Neighborhood high schools for Center City and the Center City area, located outside of Center City, include:
 Benjamin Franklin High School
 Furness High School
 South Philadelphia High School

Other high schools include:
 Bodine High School for International Affairs
 Constitution High School for American Studies
  Franklin Learning Center High School
 Parkway Center City High School
 Philadelphia High School for Business and Technology
 Science Leadership Academy

Combined middle and high schools include:
 Julia R. Masterman School

Charter schools
Charter schools not operated by the School District of Philadelphia include:
Grades 1-12:
Mathematics, Civics and Sciences Charter School
Grades 7-12:
The Mastery Charter Schools system operates the Mastery Charter Lenfest Campus (7-12) in Old City. It moved from North Philadelphia to Old City in 2002.
Grades 5-8:
Freire Charter Middle School
Grades 6-12:
World Communications Charter School
Grades 9-12:
Architecture and Design Charter School
Freire Charter High School
Mastery Charter High School
Philadelphia Electrical and Technology Charter School
Grades K-8:
Laboratory Charter School of Communication and Languages
Folk Arts-Cultural Treasures Charter School
Grades 6-8:
Wakisha Charter School
Grades K-7:
Christopher Columbus Charter School
Independence Charter School grades K-8
People for People Charter School
Grades Pre-K-8:
Russell Byers Charter School
Grades K-6:
Universal Institute Charter School

Private schools

Roman Catholic parochial schools
The Roman Catholic Archdiocese of Philadelphia operates the following Roman Catholic parochial schools in the Center City area :
Grades 9-12:
J. W. Hallahan Catholic Girls High School
Roman Catholic High School
Grades Pre-K-8:
St. Francis Xavier School
St. Peter the Apostle School
Grades K-8:
St. Mary's Interparochial School
Grades 1-8:
Holy Redeemer School

Other private schools
Other private schools in the Center City area include:
Grades Pre-K-12:
Friends Select School
Grades 9-12:
City Center Academy
Grades Pre-K-8:
St. Peter's School
The Philadelphia School

Public libraries

The Free Library of Philadelphia operates the Parkway Central Library at 1901 Vine Street, the Independence Branch at 18 South 7th Street, the Philadelphia City Institute on the first floor and lower level of an apartment complex at 1905 Locust Street, and the Library for the Blind and Physically Handicapped at 919 Walnut Street.

Other institutions
Middle States Association of Colleges and Schools is headquartered in Center City.

Culture

Music and theatre

Center City Philadelphia is home to some of the nation and world's leading cultural institutions. Avenue of the Arts, a city-designated cultural district, includes Kimmel Center for the Performing Arts, which houses the Philadelphia Orchestra, a Big Five orchestras) and the Academy of Music, home of the Philadelphia Ballet and Opera Philadelphia. The avenue is home to multiple theatres, including the Miller, Suzanne Roberts, and Wilma theatres. Forrest Theatre is also located in center city, at 1114 
Walnut Street.

Museums
Mütter Museum, a medical museum, is located in center city at 19 S. 22nd Street.

Recreation
Center City Philadelphia has a vast number of restaurants, bars, and nightclubs. McGillin's Olde Ale House, at 1310 Drury Street, is one of the nation's oldest pubs (founded in 1860).

Transportation

Major highways
Interstate 76
Interstate 95
Interstate 676/Benjamin Franklin Bridge
U.S. Route 30
PA Route 3
PA Route 611

Streets and bridges
Center city streets and bridges include Benjamin Franklin Bridge, which connects the city with Camden, New Jersey, and Benjamin Franklin Parkway, a one-mile long parkway that runs from Philadelphia City Hall to the Philadelphia Museum of Art. Three major center city streets are Broad, Market, and South Streets.

Local public transit

 Center City Commuter Connection
SEPTA
Jefferson Station (Regional Rail)
Suburban Station (Regional Rail)
Market-Frankford Line (2nd Street, 5th Street/Independence Hall, 8th Street, 11th Street, 13th Street, and 15th Street stations)
Broad Street Line (Spring Garden, Race-Vine, City Hall, Walnut-Locust, and Lombard-South stations on main line; Chinatown and 8th Street stations on Broad-Ridge Spur)
Subway-surface trolley lines (13th Street, 15th Street, 19th Street, and 22nd Street stations; all stations on Market Street)
Various bus routes
PATCO Speedline (8th & Market, 9-10th & Locust, 12-13th & Locust, and 15-16th & Locust Street stations)
New Jersey Transit (various bus routes & stops)
There is a 500,000+ sq ft underground pedestrian concourse that connects many of the center city Septa stations to businesses and office buildings. Primarily running under Market Street and Broad Street, the concourse spans east to west from 8th street to 18th street and north to south from John F. Kennedy Boulevard to Spruce Street.

Intercity public transit

Philadelphia Greyhound Terminal (Greyhound, Peter Pan, and various Trailways buses)
Megabus (30th Street Station)
Various Chinatown bus lines (various operators & stops; most stops near 11th & Arch Streets)

Amtrak's primary Philadelphia station, 30th Street Station, is located immediately west of Center City, just across the Schuylkill River.  SEPTA Regional Rail trains, New Jersey Transit Atlantic City Line trains, Market-Frankford Line trains, and subway-surface line trolleys also service 30th Street Station, and both Megabus and BoltBus stop on streets adjacent to the station.

 Taiwanese airline China Airlines provides a private bus service to and from John F. Kennedy International Airport in New York City for customers based in the Philadelphia area. This service previously stopped in Center City in front of the Marriott Hotel.

Center City Residents' Association 
The Center City Residents' Association, originally formed in 1947 to prevent Rittenhouse Square from being turned into a parking lot, is a primary advocate for quality of life issues in Center City. Other community organizations of this type include Logan Square Neighborhood Association, Society Hill Civic Association, South of South Street Neighborhood Association, Washington Square West Civic Association, and the Queen Village Neighbors Association.

Gallery

See also

Curtis Publishing Company
Independence National Historical Park
National Register of Historic Places listings in Center City, Philadelphia

References

External links

Center City District and Central Philadelphia Development Corporation
How the 700 block of Market Street evolved
Center City Residents' Association

 
 Center City
Philly
Economy of Philadelphia